Malaika Kubwa (name changed in 2018; born 17 May 1988), known professionally as Martina Big  is a German model and actress known for her extremely large breast implants, and for undergoing a perma-tanning procedure to give herself a dark skin color. Big currently identifies as black.

Career and personal life  
After graduating high school, Big began a career as flight attendant alongside her longtime partner Michael, who was a pilot. She quit working as a flight attendant in 2012 to pursue modeling and acting full-time. In 2017, Big confirmed in the Swedish television show Outsiders that she had the biggest breasts in Europe, employing a water displacement test.

Body modifications 
On 3 December 2012, Big underwent a breast augmentation with large expandable implants. Since then she had 23 procedures to add volume to her breasts, reaching a bra size of 32 S.

In January 2017, Big underwent a perma-tanning procedure to give her the appearance of a black woman. In February 2018, she traveled to Kenya and lived there with the tribes of the Maasai and Samburu. A local clergyman baptized her to be a true Kenyan woman. She was given the baptismal name Malaika Kubwa; in Swahili, "malaika" means "angel" and "kubwa" means "big".

In May 2019, she had her previous breast implants replaced by new, bigger, expandable models, which are the biggest breast implants in the world, each with a rated volume of 20,000cc.

Filmography

Television

References

External links 

People known for their body modification
German actresses
German female models
Living people
German television personalities
1988 births
Transracial people